Phytoene is a 40-carbon intermediate in the biosynthesis of carotenoids. The synthesis of phytoene is the first committed step in the synthesis of carotenoids in plants. Phytoene is produced from two molecules of geranylgeranyl pyrophosphate (GGPP) by the action of the enzyme phytoene synthase.  The two GGPP molecules are condensed together followed by removal of diphosphate and proton shift leading to the formation of phytoene.

Dietary phytoene and phytofluene are found in a number of human tissues including the liver, lung, breast, prostate, colon, and skin. Accumulation of these carotenoids in the skin may protect the skin by several mechanisms: acting as UV absorbers, as antioxidants, and as anti-inflammatory agents.

Structure 

Phytoene is a symmetric molecule containing three conjugated double bonds. Phytoene has a UV-Vis absorption spectrum typical for a triply conjugated system with its main absorption maximum in the UVB range at 286 nm and with ε1% of 915.

Sources 

Analysis of several fruits and vegetables showed that phytoene and phytofluene are found in majority of fruits and vegetables. In contrast to all other carotenoids, phytoene and phytofluene, the first carotenoid precursors in the biosynthetic pathway of other carotenoids, absorb light in the UV range.

History

The structure of phytoene was established and proven by total synthesis, by the Basil Weedon group in 1966.

References

7.	Book chapter: Liki von Oppen-Bezalel, Aviv Shaish. Application of the Colorless Carotenoids, Phytoene, and Phytofluene in Cosmetics, Wellness, Nutrition, and Therapeutics. In The alga Dunaliella: Biodiversity, Physiology, Genomics & Biotechnology. Eds. Ami Ben-Amotz, Juergen Polle, and Subba Rao, released May 2009 by Science Publishers, Enfield, NH, USA (2009)

Carotenoids
Tetraterpenes
Substances discovered in the 1960s